In mathematics, hyperbolic complex space is a Hermitian manifold which is the equivalent of the real hyperbolic space in the context of complex manifolds. The complex hyperbolic space is a Kähler manifold, and it is characterised by being the only simply connected Kähler manifold whose holomorphic sectional curvature is constant equal to -1. Its underlying Riemannian manifold has non-constant negative curvature, pinched between -1 and -1/4 (or -4 and -1, according to the choice of a normalization of the metric): in particular, it is a CAT(-1/4) space. 

Complex hyperbolic spaces are also the symmetric spaces associated with the Lie groups . They constitute one of the three families of rank one symmetric spaces of noncompact type, together with real and quaternionic hyperbolic spaces, classification to which must be added one exceptional space, the Cayley plane.

Construction of the complex hyperbolic space

Projective model 
Let  be a pseudo-Hermitian form of signature  in the complex vector space . The projective model of the complex hyperbolic space is the projectivized space of all negative vectors for this form: 

As an open set of the complex projective space, this space is endowed with the structure of a complex manifold.

This model is the equivalent of the Poincaré disk model. Contrary to the real hyperbolic space, the complex projective space cannot be defined as a sheet of the hyperboloid , because the projection of this hyperboloid onto the projective model has connected fiber  (the fiber being  in the real case).

As can be seen by computation, this inner product does not depend on the choice of the representant . In order to have holomorphic sectional curvature equal to -1 and not -4, one needs to renormalize this metric by a  factor. This metric is a Kähler metric.

Siegel model
The Siegel model of complex hyperbolic space is the subset of  such that

It is biholomorphic to the unit ball in  via the Cayley transform

Group of holomorphic isometries and symmetric space

The group of holomorphic isometries of the complex hyperbolic space is the Lie group . This group acts transitively on the complex hyperbolic space, and the stabilizer of a point is isomorphic to the unitary group . The complex hyperbolic space is thus homeomorphic to the homogeneous space .

As a consequence, the complex hyperbolic space is the Riemannian symmetric space , where  is the pseudo-unitary group.

Curvature

The group of holomorphic isometries  acts transitively on the tangent complex lines of the hyperbolic complex space. This is why this space has constant holomorphic sectional curvature, that can be computed to be equal to -4 (with the above normalization of the metric). This property characterizes the hyperbolic complex space : up to isometric biholomorphism, there is only one simply connected complete Kähler manifold of given constant holomorphic sectional curvature.

This angle equals 0 if and only if  is a complex line, and equals  if and only if  is totally real. Thus the sectional curvature of the complex hyperbolic space varies from -4 (for complex lines) to -1 (for totally real planes).

In complex dimension 1, every real plane in the tangent space is a complex line: thus the hyperbolic complex space of dimension 1 has constant curvature equal to -1, and by the uniformization theorem, it is isometric to the real hyperbolic plane. Hyperbolic complex spaces can thus be seen as another high-dimensional generalization of the hyperbolic plane, less standard than the real hyperbolic spaces. A third possible generalization is the homogeneous space , which for  again coincides with the hyperbolic plane, but becomes a symmetric space of rank greater than 1 when .

Totally geodesic subspaces

Every totally geodesic submanifold of the complex hyperbolic space of dimension n is one of the following :
 a copy of a complex hyperbolic space of smaller dimension
 a copy of a real hyperbolic space of real dimension smaller than 
In particular, there is no codimension 1 totally geodesic subspace of the complex hyperbolic space.

See also
Hyperbolic space
Quaternionic hyperbolic space

References

Differential geometry
Riemannian geometry
Lie groups
Homogeneous spaces